Reuther is a surname. Notable people with the surname include:

Bernd Reuther (born 1971), German politician
Danny Reuther (born 1988), German football midfielder who plays for SV Schott Jena
Ronald Theodore Reuther (1929–2007), committed naturalist who managed several major zoos, and an aviation enthusiast
Victor G. Reuther (1912–2004), prominent international labor organizer
Walter Reuther (1907–1970), American labor union leader

See also
Walter P. Reuther Library, Archives of Labor and Urban Affairs on the campus of Wayne State University in Detroit
Reuther's Treaty of Detroit, five-year contract negotiated by trade union president Walter Reuther
Walter P. Reuther Freeway (I-696)
Walter Reuther Central High School, high school located in downtown Kenosha, Wisconsin
Dutch Ruether, Walter Henry Ruether (1893–1970), U.S. baseball player
 Ruether (surname)

German toponymic surnames